Bucklin Township may refer to the following townships in the United States:

 Bucklin Township, Ford County, Kansas
 Bucklin Township, Michigan, a former name of Nankin Township, Michigan in Wayne County